Shidao Bay Nuclear Power Plant, commonly known as Shidaowan, is a nuclear power plant in Shandong province, China. The site is located near the Xiqianjia village in Ningjin subdistrict, Rongcheng, Weihai, Shandong.

The plant has the first fourth-generation nuclear reactors in the world: the HTR-PM, a high-temperature gas-cooled reactor (HTGR) concept. The plant will ultimately have ten 210 MWe (megawatts electrical) units of this type. Each unit is made of two HTR-PM reactors driving a single 210 MWe steam turbine.

The plant also hosts the construction of two 1500 MWe CAP1400 pressurized water reactors, a design based on the AP1000 jointly developed by Westinghouse and China's State Nuclear Power Technology Corporation (SNPTC).

Shidao Bay nuclear power plant is a joint venture by China Huaneng Group, China Nuclear Engineering & Construction Group, and Tsinghua University. The total investment of 100 billion yuan (US$15.7 billion) and the 20-year construction plan makes it one of China's large nuclear projects.

HTR-PM

In 2005, China announced its intention to scale up the HTR-10 experimental reactor for commercial power generation. The first two 250-MWt High-Temperature Reactor-Pebble-bed Modules (HTR-PM) will be installed at Shidao Bay, and together drive a steam turbine generating 200 MWe.

Originally to be started in 2011, the project was postponed after the Fukushima Daiichi nuclear disaster in Japan in March 2011. In 2009, it was planned to be finished in 2013. Construction finally began at the end of 2012, with the pouring of concrete basemat occurring in April 2014. The vessel was installed in 2016. It was expected to begin operating around 2017, later postponed to 2018.
The pressure vessel head was installed in December 2017. Cold testing was completed in November 2020. 
Hot functional testing of the reactors began in January 2021, and operational start up is planned for late 2021. The first reactor went critical, marking the first criticality of a generation IV commercial nuclear power plant, in September 2021. Reactor two achieved first criticality in November 2021. Reactor one was connected to the state power grid and began producing power in December 2021  The HTR-PM project demonstrated it had reached "initial full power" in December 2022. An updated larger power plant, HTR-PM600, is planned with a capacity of 600 MWe using six HTR-PM reactor units.

CAP1400
In November 2006, State Power Investment Corporation (SPIC) introduced the AP1000, a third-generation pressurized water reactor design, from the U.S. company Westinghouse Electric Corporation. Since then China built four AP1000 units, two in the Sanmen Nuclear Power Station, and another two in the Haiyang Nuclear Power Plant.

China has been researching and developing its own version of the AP1000, the more powerful CAP1400, also referred to as Guohe One (Guo He One, i.e. unity of the country).

Preparation work started in 2013 and Unit 1 construction started in 2018. Completion estimated in 2021.

In May 2016, the CAP1400 design has successfully passed the International Atomic Energy Agency's (IAEA) Generic Reactor Safety Review.

According to SPIC, the company is building two CAP1400 reactors in a demonstration project located in the Shidao Bay nuclear plant.

In March 2017, the Unit 1 first CAP1400 reactor pressure vessel hydraulic test was completed at the factory test site. The pressure vessel is the core equipment of the reactor and has a total weight of about 487 tons and a design life of 60 years.

On 30 June 2017, the Unit 1 first low-pressure module LP2 of the CAP1400 National Nuclear Demonstration Project Turbine, was completed by Dongfang Electric Group Dongfang Steam Turbine Co., Ltd. The CAP1400 steam turbine low-pressure rotor has a weight of 267 tons and the whole block weight is 749 tons. The LP2 steam turbine will help drive the CAP1400 1,520 MW generator.

In March 2022 it was announced that commercial operation of the two CAP-1400 units is expected to commence in 2025.

Reactor data
The Shidao Bay Nuclear Power Plant consist of two operational reactors (that drive one unit), two reactors under construction, and four planned future reactors.

See also

Nuclear power in China
List of nuclear reactors#China

References

Nuclear power stations in China
Buildings and structures in Shandong
Nuclear power stations with reactors under construction
Nuclear power stations with proposed reactors